Suada is a genus of grass skippers in the family Hesperiidae.

Species
Suada swerga (de Nicéville, [1884]) Ceylon, Malaya, Java, Vietnam, Burma, Thailand, Laos, Malaya
Suada albolineata Devyatkin, 2000 Vietnam
Suada albinus (Semper, 1892) Philippines
Suada cataleucos (Staudinger, 1889) Philippines, Palawan

Biology 
The larvae feed on Gramineae including Dendrocalamus.

References

External links
Natural History Museum Lepidoptera genus database
Suada de Nicéville, 1895 at Markku Savela's Lepidoptera and Some Other Life Forms

Hesperiinae
Hesperiidae genera